Charles Lucas (18 July 1884 – 3 November 1975) was a British sports shooter. He competed in the trap event at the 1952 Summer Olympics.

References

1884 births
1975 deaths
British male sport shooters
Olympic shooters of Great Britain
Shooters at the 1952 Summer Olympics
Sportspeople from Leeds